The National Park Travelers Club (or NPTC) is a non-profit 501(c)7 social club organization. Its mission is to provide networking and recognition opportunities for visitors to America's National Park System. This Club acts to support and expand appreciation of the U.S. National Park System.

Description
The NPTC was organized in 2004, at the second meeting of a small group of National Park enthusiasts. Since then, it has grown to over 3000 dues paying members (dues are $10 for the first year, and $5 per year after that), and over 18000 members of the free online site. Paying dues gives members access to the Master List, Master Database, and Master Map of all known National Park Passport Stamp locations, in addition to voting in club elections. The online site features trip reports and hints for visits to parks, information on legislation impacting parks, and a message board for park related topics. The membership meets yearly at the NPTC Annual Convention and also arranges smaller group meetings at events such as park dedications or important park anniversaries. Additionally, awards are given out to members meeting visitation criteria, such as visiting certain numbers of park units within a year, or over a lifetime. The NPTC publishes a quarterly newsletter called The Stamp Pad.

Conventions
The NPTC has hosted 20 annual conventions at various National Park Units. These meetings serve as an opportunity for club members to socialize, share trip stories, hear keynote presentations from National Park Service Rangers, and take group guided tours of the area. Attendance at the meeting is open to the public. A special official national park passport stamp is produced for each convention, and only available during the convention.
 2003: Delaware Water Gap National Recreation Area
 2004: Rocky Mountain National Park, the NPTC was formally chartered at this convention
 2005: Mammoth Cave National Park
 2006: Sleeping Bear Dunes National Lakeshore
 2007: Olympic National Park
 2008: Lowell National Historical Park
 2009: Sequoia National Park
 2010: El Malpais National Monument
 2011: National Mall
 2012: Apostle Islands National Lakeshore
 2013: Shiloh National Military Park
 2014: Klondike Gold Rush National Historical Park
 2015: Chamizal National Memorial
 2016: Independence National Historical Park
 2017: Mount Rushmore National Memorial
 2018: New Bedford Whaling National Historical Park
 2019: Flagstaff, Arizona area national monuments (Wupatki National Monument, Sunset Crater, Walnut Canyon National Monument)
 2020: Virtual meeting via Zoom due to the COVID-19 pandemic
 2021: Mary McLeod Bethune Council House National Historic Site & Carter G. Woodson Home National Historic Site (Washington DC)
 2022: Gateway Arch National Park & Ulysses S. Grant National Historic Site (St. Louis, MO)
 2023: Carl Sandburg Home National Historic Site (Hendersonville, NC)

Awards
The NPTC awards travelers for lifetime achievement, as well as for annual visitation of the parks.

Lifetime Achievement Awards
 Bronze: visiting 100 park units
 Silver: visiting 200 park units
 Gold: visiting 300 park units
 Titanium: visiting 400 park units
 Platinum: visiting all  current National Park System units

Annual Master Traveler Awards
 Special Achievement: collecting 20 national park passport stamps from 10 park units in 2 geographic regions
 Clean Sweep: visiting a park unit in each of the 9 geographic regions within a year
 Bronze: collecting 50 stamps from 25 units in 4 geographic regions within a year
 Silver: collecting 75 stamps from 35 units in 5 geographic regions within a year
 Gold: collecting 100 stamps from 50 units in 6 geographic regions within a year

Other awards
 Most Wanted (formerly "Ten Most Wanted"): for finding a park passport stamp that has been exceptionally difficult to locate
 Surprise Park (discontinued after 2012): for visiting a park selected each year by the President of the club for having an anniversary of historical importance
 Civil War 150th Anniversary (discontinued after 2015): for visiting a Civil War related site and collecting its stamp on the anniversary of an event which happened exactly 150 years ago.

Recognition
In addition to the articles referenced below, the club has been recognized by various organizations, including:
 Amtrak 
 Eastern National 
 National Park Service

References

External links
National Park Travelers Club Official Website
Interview with founder Mike Brown

National parks of the United States
Travelers organizations
Organizations established in 2004
2004 establishments in the United States